The politics of Bihar, an eastern state of India, is dominated by regional political parties. , the main political parties are Rashtriya Janata Dal (RJD), Bharatiya Janata Party (BJP), Janata Dal (United) (JDU),  and Indian National Congress (INC). There are also some smaller regional parties, including Samata Party, Hindustani Awam Morcha, Rashtriya Lok Janata Dal, Jan Adhikar Party and Vikassheel Insaan Party, Lok Janshakti Party (Ram Vilas) and Rashtriya Lok Janshakti Party, which play a vital role in  politics of state. As of 2022, Bihar is currently ruled by Mahagatbandhan (Grandalliance) coalition.

Administration and governments 

The constitutional head of the Government of Bihar is the Governor, who is appointed by the President of India. Executive power rests with the Chief Minister and the cabinet. The political party or the coalition of parties that has a majority in the Legislative Assembly forms the government. The first Chief Minister of Bihar was Krishna Sinha and the first Deputy Chief Minister was Anugrah Narayan Sinha.

In 2014, the incumbent Chief Minister Nitish Kumar succeeded Jitan Ram Manjhi, who was sacked from his office.<ref
name=Stamp></ref> In his previous term, Kumar resigned after the general election in 2014, after which Manjhi took over.

The head of the state bureaucracy is the Chief Secretary. Under him is a hierarchy of officials drawn from the Indian Administrative Service, Indian Police Service, and other wings of the state civil services. The judiciary is headed by the Chief Justice. Bihar has a High Court that has been functioning since 1916. All of the government headquarters are situated in the state capital Patna.

For administrative purposes, Bihar state has nine divisions—Patna, Tirhut, Saran, Darbhanga, Kosi, Purnia, Bhagalpur, Munger, and Magadh Division—which between them are subdivided into thirty-eight districts.

History

Pre-Independence 

Bihar was an important part of India's struggle for independence. Mahatma Gandhi became the movement's leader after the Champaran Satyagraha, launched in the state's Champaran district at the repeated request of a local leader Raj Kumar Shukla. He was also supported by Rajendra Prasad, Anugrah Narayan Sinha, and Brajkishore Prasad.

Post Independence : 1950–1975 

The first Bihar governments in 1946 were led by Shri Krishna Sinha and Anugrah Narayan Sinha. After the independence of India, power was shared by these Gandhian nationalists: Krishna Sinha became the first Chief Minister and Anugrah Narayan Sinha served as the first Deputy Chief Minister cum Finance Minister. The death of the central railway minister Lalit Narayan Mishra in a hand grenade attack in late 1960s brought an end to indigenous, work-oriented mass leaders. The Indian National Congress (INC) controlled the state for next two decades; at this time, prominent leader Satyendra Narayan Singh left the INC following ideological differences and joined the Janata Party.

Bihar movement and aftermath: 1975–1990 

After independence also, when India was falling into an autocratic rule during the Indira Gandhi regime, the main thrust to the movement to hold elections came from Bihar under the leadership of Jayaprakash Narayan.

In 1974, Narayan led the student's movement in Bihar, which gradually developed into the popular Bihar Movement, during which JP called for a peaceful "Total Revolution". He and V. M. Tarkunde founded the Citizens for Democracy in 1974 and the People's Union for Civil Liberties in 1976 to uphold and defend civil liberties. On 23 January 1977, Indira Gandhi called fresh elections for the following March and released all political prisoners. The Indian Emergency imposed by Indira Gandhi officially ended on 23 March 1977.

In the election, the INC was defeated by the Janata Party, a coalition of several small parties created in 1977. The alliance was headed by Morarji Desai, who became the first non-INC Prime Minister of India. The Janata Party won all the fifty-four Lok Sabha seats in Bihar, taking power in the state assembly. Karpoori Thakur became the Chief Minister after winning a contest from the then-Janata Party President Satyendra Narayan Sinha.

The Communist Party in Bihar was founded in 1939. From the 1960s to the 1980s, the Communist movement in the state was led by veteran communist leaders Jagannath Sarkar, Sunil Mukherjee, Rahul Sankrityayan, Pandit Karyanand Sharma, Indradeep Sinha, and Chandrashekhar Singh. Under the leadership of Sarkar, the Communist party fought the "total revolution" led by Jayprakash Narayan as the movement was anti-democratic and challenged the fabric of Indian democracy.

The Bihar Movement campaign warned Indians that the elections might be their last chance to choose between "democracy and dictatorship". As a consequence of the movement, the identity of Bihar (from the word Vihar, meaning monasteries), representing a glorious past, was lost. Its voice often used to get lost in the din of regional clamour of other states, specially the linguistic states like Uttar Pradesh and Madhya Pradesh. Bihar also gained an anti-establishment image. The pro-establishment press often projected the state as undisciplined and anarchic.

Because the regional identity was slowly being sidelined, it was replaced by caste-based politics; power was initially in the hands of the Brahmins, Bhumihars and Rajputs. In the 1980s there was a change in the political scenario of Bihar: riding upon a popular movement of "social justice" and no vote without representation, the middle OBC castes like Yadav, Kurmi, and Koeri replaced upper castes in politics.

S.N. Singh's regime was known for deteriorating law and order, which included the 1989 Bhagalpur violence, one of the biggest riots in the state's history. A report tabled in the Bihar Legislative Assembly under the chairmanship of N.N. Singh blamed the Sinha-led INC government for the riots. The 1,000-page report outlined his and his administration's inactivity for almost two months, during which over 1,000 people—mostly poor Muslim weavers—were killed and 50,000 more were displaced.

In 1989, an anti-Congress wave defeated the entrenched INC, and Janata Dal came to power on an anti-corruption wave. In between, the socialist movement lead by Mahamaya Prasad Sinha and Karpoori Thakur tried to break the status quo. The movement failed, due to the impractical idealism of its leaders and to the machinations of the INC's central leaders, who felt threatened by the large, politically aware state.

Law and order in Bihar: 1947-1990
Records of the time indicate that in the feudal society of Bihar, the Dalit and landless agricultural labourers suffered not only from the economic hardships but also the undignified practices like Dola Pratha practiced by the upper-caste groups notably, the Rajputs. Under this social practice, the newly wed bride of a Dalit Kamia (labourer) was forced to spend her night before the marriage with the feudal lord. Other sources also indicate that the Dalit women were also sexually available to the upper-caste landlords, as they worked in their fields for low wages. It is also believed that the frequent rapes of these women from the families of agricultural labourers were the cause behind the rise of naxalism in the Bhojpur region of Bihar, an area known for the prevalence of worst form of feudalism. With the passage of Bihar's land reform legislation, the benefit of which was shared by only a few upper-backward caste groups and the subsequent steps taken by the upper-castes to keep a substantial part of their holdings by manipulating the loopholes in the decree, elevated the naxal movements in the state. But, the class struggle was intriguing in the state, as a section of upper-backwards were also landlords. The participation of middle peasantry or the upper backwards in the class war also remained evident making them involved in a two-front confrontation against both the Dalits, the supporters of naxalite movement as well as the upper-caste, who were admant to keep the status-quo maintained.

Besides the ongoing class struggle which became a caste war, the police excesses were also rampant in this period and atrocities by the police force on civilians were recorded. There are incidents of the police force abusing civilians, primarily from the lower castes. There are also incidences in which due to caste affiliation and similar factors, the police personnel have attacked the villages inhabited by the lower-castes after the private armies of the upper-caste landlords perpetrated the massacres during the 1970s.

Under Lalu Yadav: 1990–2004

Janata Dal came to power in Bihar in 1990 after its 1989 national victory. Lalu Prasad Yadav became Chief Minister after narrowly winning the leadership contest of the legislative party against Ram Sundar Das, a former chief minister from the Janata Party and close to eminent Janata Party leaders Chandrashekhar and S.N. Sinha. Later, Yadav gained mass popularity with a series of populist measures. The principled socialists, including Nitish Kumar, gradually left him and by 1995, Yadav was both chief minister of the state and president of his party, Rashtriya Janata Dal. He was a popular, charismatic leader.

Caste politics of Yadav

According to Seyed Hossein Zarhani, though Lalu Yadav became a figure of hatred among Forward Castes, he had much support from backward castes and Dalits. He was criticised for neglecting development but a study conducted during his premiership among Musahars revealed though the construction of houses for them was not concluded at the required pace, they chose Prasad because he returned them their ijjat (honour) and allowed them to vote for the first time.

During Yadav's tenure, a number of populist policies that directly impacted his backward-caste supporters, including the establishment of "Charvaha schools" for poor children; abolition of cess on toddy, and the rules protecting backward castes were enforced. Yadav mobilised backward castes through his identity politics. He viewed Forward Castes as elite in outlook and portrayed himself as the "Messiah of backwards" by living the same way as his mostly poor supporters. He continued to live in his single-room dwelling after being elected as Chief Minister, though he later moved to the official residence for administrative convenience.

Another significant development during Yadav's premiership was the recruitment of large numbers backward castes and communities to government services. The government's white paper claimed to have a large number of vacancies in health and other sectors. The rules of recruitment were changed to benefit backward castes who supported Lalu. The frequent transfer of existing officers, who were at the higher echelon of bureaucracy, was an important feature of Yadav's and Rabri Devi's administration, which led to the collapse of entire system. Yadav, however, continued to lead Bihar due to massive support from backward castes, to whom he projected "honour" to be more important than development. According to Zarhani, for the lower castes he was a charismatic leader who succeeded in becoming their voice.

Yadav mobilised his Dalit supporters by popularising the lower-caste folk heroes, who were famed for vanquishing the upper caste adversaries, for example, a popular Dalit saint who ran away with an upper caste girl and suppressed all her kin. Praising him could enrage Bhumihar caste in some parts of Bihar but Yadav participated in a grand celebration every year near Patna. His energetic participation in this show made it a rallying point for Dalits, who saw it as their victory and the harassment of upper castes.

Yadav could not restart development of the state. When corruption charges were laid against him, he resigned as chief minister and appointed his wife Rabri Devi, in his place, allowing himself to rule by proxy, and the administration quickly deteriorated.

According to Kalyani Shankar, Yadav created a feeling among the oppressed castes that they are the real rulers of state under him. The upper caste, 13.2% of the population, controlled most of the land while the backwards castes, 51% of the population, own very little land. With the advent of Yadav, the economic profile of the state changed as the backward castes diversified their occupations and also controlled more land. By stopping Lal Krishna Advani's controversial "Ram Rath Yatra", Yadav also installed a sense of confidence among Muslims, who developed a sense of insecurity after the 1989 Bhagalpur Riots. According to Shankar, during this period, upper castes were marginalised and backwards castes came to control the power firmly.

Rabri Devi's administration

When Rabri Devi succeeded Lalu Yadav as Chief Minister, Yadav, who was jailed, was still able to influence the government. This period saw the rise of strongmen from both upper and backward castes. The Yadav-Rabri administration was not supported by Forward Castes due to their political and socio-economic marginalisation under Yadav's rule. A number of influential criminals, who were portrayed as leaders of their castes, entered politics as a reaction against Yadav's "backward caste politics". People like Vijay Kumar Shukla (Munna Shukla), Anand Mohan Singh, Rama Singh and Prabhunath Singh supported the upper castes by launching retribution against lower and middle castes. In Vaishali district, for example, Munna Shukla and his associates consistently clashed with Yadav's minister Brij Bihari Prasad, a Bania, resulting in assassination of Chhotan Shukla, Munna's brother and associate, in the retribution of which Prasad was also killed. Anand Mohan also brought havoc to the supporters of a Reservation and Mandal Commission report by forming his "Samajwadi Krantikari Sena", which was a lynching party of upper castes until it was taken over by Yadav's close confidante Pappu Yadav. Munna Shukla and Anand Mohan were convicted of the murder of Gopalganj District Magistrate, G. Krishnaiah, a Dalit.

Lalu Yadav's brothers-in-law Sadhu Yadav and Subhash Prasad Yadav, were also running parallel governments in their own areas of influence. Devi was not able to cope with the situation, nor with the flourishing private armies of the landlords, which had existed since the 1960s. In retaliation, the landless labourers and the poor middle-caste peasantry began their own organisations, such as Lal Sena and the Communist Party of India (Marxist–Leninist) Liberation.

A number of big massacres had also taken place in the decades before Yadav's and Rabri's administrations. In the Dalelchak-bhagora massacre, during Bindeshwari Dubey's government, 42 Rajputs were killed by the Maoist Communist Centre (MCC), one of Yadav caste's lynching parties. The MCC also committed the Senari carnage, in which Bhumihars were victimised. Large numbers of Dalits were also killed by the upper castes, in the Laxmanpur Bathe massacre. In the Nawada region, the Ashok Mahto gang formed by Koeri and Kurmis, was in a drawn-out battle with the "Akhilesh Singh gang" of Bhumihars. The Mahto gang killed Akhilesh Singh's father-in-law and a number of his family members, causing a severe blow to the ambitions of the Akhilesh Singh gang that was poised to take control of the rural area.

The root cause of these skirmishes was attempts to grab land in the wake of the deteriorating economy and administration: the Dalelchak-Bhagora massacre was precipitated by a conflict over hundreds of acres of disputed land between Yadavs and Rajputs; in the case of Nawada, the claimants were Koeri-Kurmi and Bhumihars. The Naxalite cadres, who were mobilising people from lower castes, were active since 1960s, when the first mass murders of upper caste landlords occurred under the leadership of Jagdish Mahto. The upper castes countered these forces with their private armies like Kuer Sena and Ranvir Sena, while landlords from backward castes did the same through Bhumi Sena and the Lorik Sena.

Rape as a tool to establish caste supremacy
The premiership of Rabri Devi reportedly saw rise in the incidents of rape, which in most of the cases was seen as the tool to establish caste supremacy upon the lower castes by the dominant caste groups, prevalent since post colonial period. Among those caste groups who were perpetrating such incidents were the Rajputs, Bhumihars and the Yadavs. In one of such incidents a girl was abducted and raped by a Rajput landlord who deserted her after repeatedly raping her for a month. When the victim tried to file a police report, she was subjected to custodial rape for two successive nights by the station in charge, Badri Singh and Deputy Superintendent of Police, Arvind Thakur. In another incident, a group of armed Yadav men fell upon a village, exploding crude bombs and burning the huts of the Dalits. The anguished villagers fled to save their lives while a woman was dragged out, beaten and consequently raped by the perpetrators. It was believed that political connection of the criminals was the reason behind inactivity of police in many of such cases.

The assertion of caste supremacy through rapes was not a new phenomenon in the state. In the feudal society of post-colonial Bihar too, there are reports of Rajput landlords visiting the villages inhabited by Harijans and asking the men to send their wives and daughters to the Kothi to spend the night with the landlord. It was also reported through a senior police officer, which could be true for some parts of Bihar like Jehanabad, that a practice of making the husband of the Dalit woman lay below the cot where the landlord would rape her wife keeping his rifle besides her, prevailed. If there would be any sort of movement or the attempt to resist the rape, the landlord would shoot her husband to death. Various reports indicate the underreporting of such cases in the subsequent periods.

2004: Kumar's administration 

By 2004, The Economist magazine said "Bihar [had] become a byword for the worst of India, of widespread and inescapable poverty, of corrupt politicians indistinguishable from mafia-dons they patronise, caste-ridden social order that has retained the worst feudal cruelties". As public disaffection intensified, the RJD was voted out of power and Yadav lost an election to a coalition headed by his former ally Nitish Kumar.

Politics of development under Kumar
Nitish Kumar, a once-close aide of Lalu Yadav, split with his party after the "Yadavisation" of politics and the administration. According to Arun Sinha, Yadav initially wanted to project Kumar as the leader of the Kurmi community, but Kumar had much bigger ambitions. On many occasions, Kumar refrained from associating himself with a particular community, even his own caste. During Yadav's tenure, a Kurmi chetna rally was organised in Patna. Kumar initially decided not to attend the rally but he and George Fernández eventually attended. At the rally, Kumar attacked Yadav's rule and the alleged marginalisation of other castes, who were equally ambitious as the Yadavs.

Initially, Kumar suffered defeats to Yadav and his party but was eventually was able to form a social axis of "forward castes" with Koeri and Kurmi caste, who were Kumar's core supporters. After assuming power, Kumar launched a series of strikes against criminal politicians. All of the former "bahubalis" (strongman) politicians were jailed, as were the politicians-turned-criminals Prabhunath Singh, Mohammad Shahabuddin and Anand Mohan Singh. In his bid to make Bihar crime-free, many politicians from Kumar's own party were arrested. The era of "identity politics" unleashed by Yadav was replaced by "politics of development". Though caste-based rallies were still organised to mobilise voters during elections, Kumar's detachment from such rallies became a point of discussion. A rally of Kurmis in Gandhi Maidan drew statewide attention when media reported that while the crowd was enthused by the presence of Chief Minister and slogans like Garv se kaho ham Kurmi hai (say it with pride, I am a Kurmi) were chanted, he did not utter a word on caste.

2015 onwards: Alliance of RJD and JDU

Nitish Kumar had displaced Yadav's Rashtriya Janata Dal from power in 2005 by forging alliance with the right-wing Bharatiya Janata Party, with massive support base among the privileged upper-caste and urban population, specially the trader class. Later, he consolidated his vote base by including many other deprived communities in the fold of this newly formed alliance, which included some of the caste groups placed at the lowest level in the caste hierarchy like Doms and Musahars. The support among them was sought by placing them into the category of Mahadalit which entailed separate affirmative actions for their socio-economic advancement. The distribution of bicycles for school girls from poor families were other steps taken by him. Kumar sought the transfer of a portion of backward caste votes which was to be merged with BJP's vote base in order to make the alliance formidable one.

In the subsequent years, Kumar remained critical to the Yadav's politics and even accused his rule as Jungleraj (the era of misgovernance) while reminding his electorate of the same. It was reported that after assuming power in 2005, he let the law enforcement authorities loose on the petty criminals and also on those who were patronised during his predecessor's regime.

There have been instances when Kumar engaged in the battle of words against Yadav family. In 2010, Rabri Devi reportedly called Kumar a "thief" and "dishonest" to which Kumar also responded by calling Yadav family, recalcitrants who have decided never to reform.

In 2015, following his ideological differences with the Bharatiya Janta Party, Nitish Kumar switched the grand old alliance becoming the member of Mahagathbandhan or the grand alliance along with his chief political rival Rashtriya Janata Dal of Yadav. Earlier, Kumar had been contesting the elections upon the promises of development which was evident from the manifesto of his party but the new alliance brought the conundrum of confronting BJP's Hindutva politics. The Bharatiya Janata Party had been securing the victories on the basis of its majoritarian ideology as well as "Modi factor" amidst communally charged political atmosphere. The BJP also secured the support of two of the influential caste groups, earlier believed to be the supporters of Yadav and Kumar by managing to win Upendra Kushwaha and Lok Janshakti Party to its side. The Hindutva politics was to confront the caste politics as put by social historian Badri Narayan, who identified the political turmoil of 2015 as a part of the challenge faced by many regional political parties and the leaders all of which enjoyed the support of specific caste groups within their states. Yadav was the key factor in this election who raised the popular slogan of "Mandal versus Kamandal", a slogan popular in 1990 when BJP responded to the politics of quota for the backward castes with its communal politics in order to subdue caste-based identity under the unique Hindu identity. Going a step further, Yadav demanded 60% reservation for the lower castes employed in the private sector and the contract jobs.

During the election campaigning set in the charged political atmosphere of 2015, the caste and religion-based mobilisation of the voters began. Yadav's remarks in which he argued that some Hindus eat beef provided an opportunity to the BJP which instigated the Hindus, including the Yadavs to vote the grand alliance out of power. Narendra Modi himself made this remark a campaign issue and attacked Yadav in his rallies.

In due course, the BJP arranged its leaders and Bollywood superstars for its election campaigning, all of them remaining critical to Kumar's rule and the criticism of the grand alliance was made in every rally by the BJP leaders and their star campaigners to which Kumar left Yadav to defend himself. The narrative of "Bade Bhai" (big brother), the word used by Kumar for Yadav was also popularised. It is believed that the BJP's rise under Modi in 2014 General Elections was a counterrevolution against the Mandal gains. According to Jaffrelot, the rising to power of BJP led to the return of upper castes in urban politics with nearly 45% of the BJP Member of Parliament belonging to the upper-caste, a consequence of this over-representation was the disproportionate ticket distribution plan of the BJP. The return of the upper castes to politics also revived some of their orthodoxy and ethos via state vigilantism. One of the evident strategies of BJP to counter Mandal gains was the restructuring of quota rules to the benefit of upper castes which includes the lateral entry and privatisation as Jaffrelot sums up.

A Times of India report called this alliance as the attempt to revive Triveni Sangh, a pre-independence alliance of three middle peasant castes, which was called as the first attempt of the backward communities to unite under an organisational structure, in order to seek political representation. Based on the input of the political thinkers from Bihar, the report called the Yadav-Kumar alliance, the coalition of middle castes who were traditionally involved in agricultural and allied activities in pre-independence period.

Despite speculation by the media, the Lalu-Nitish alliance trumped the BJP and its coalition partners, securing a majority of seats in the Bihar Legislative Assembly. The victory came with the largest ever increase in the number of the OBC candidates primarily from the Yadav, Kurmi and the Koeri caste; who were the core voters of the alliance. It was also reported that due to these three castes voting together after a long time since Kumar defected from Yadav's Janata Dal in the 1990s, the upper-caste representation reached its lowest at 23.9% in the Bihar assembly.

Splits and mergers in the JD(U) and emergence of new coalitions

The Janata Dal (United), a successor of Samata Party, replaced the Rashtriya Janata Dal in the period after misgovernance of Rabri Devi regime. The JD(U) however failed to remain intact amidst splits and defection created in it by some of the old leaders of party who defected from it on the ground of ideological conflicts. Upendra Kushwaha, who claimed to be the tallest leader of the Kushwaha caste, thus defected to found his own political party in 2013. Kushwaha had defected from JD(U) earlier too, but had returned to its fold due to poor performance of his party and conciliatory measures taken by JD(U) leadership to bring him again into the party. However, the defection of 2013 led to foundation of Rashtriya Lok Samata Party which gave impressive performance in 2014 elections to the Lok Sabha by winning three seats in alliance with the Bharatiya Janata Party. The performance of Rashtriya Lok Samata Party hadn't remained impressive afterwards, specially after Kushwaha brought it out of the National Democratic Alliance over the question of less seats allotted to it in 2019 Lok Sabha polls. The party then contested the 2019 election as a member of Mahagathbandhan.

The party performed badly again and the new alliance was sought with minor players like Bahujan Samaj Party and AIMIM in 2020 Bihar Legislative Assembly elections. The new coalition which was called as Grand Democratic Secular Front was successful in winning 6 seats in the elections but RLSP failed to win any seats despite having largest share of votes among its coalition partners. The RLSP however successfully deteriorated the caste equation of JD(U) in a dozen constituencies, which resulted in reduction of the number of seats of JD (U) to 43 in 2020 Bihar Assembly. The Bharatiya Janata Party now emerged as significant player in the house with 75 seats. The conflict between the officeholders of the JD(U) and BJP also surfaced over the choice of Chief Minister, as many of the BJP leaders and workers wanted the Chief Ministerial candidate from the BJP, which was second largest party in the house and a bigger partner in the alliance in comparison to the JD(U). The top leaders of BJP however proposed Nitish Kumar as the leader of coalition and the next chief minister once again. The government formation in 2020 witnessed dominance of BJP, which got more ministerial births and appointed two Deputy Chief Ministers, both belonging to Extremely Backward Castes in order to create a new caste coalition for itself. In the aftermath of government formation, the JD (U) took energetic steps to recover its lost vote base by engulfing the leaders from smaller parties like Bahujan Samaj Party and the organisational changes were also made by appointing Ramchandra Prasad Singh and Umesh Kushwaha as its National and state president, in a bid to strengthen the Luv-Kush alliance (defined as the coalition of Kurmi and Kushwaha caste). The most awaited step to strengthen this alliance was the merger of Rashtriya Lok Samata Party into JD(U) in 2021, after which its leader Upendra Kushwaha was appointed as the president of parliamentary board of the JD(U).

Present condition
Despite the separation from Bihar of financially richer Jharkhand, Bihar has seen more growth in recent years.

, Bihar's main political party groupings are Bharatiya Janata Party and the Janata Dal (United)-Rashtriya Janata Dal led coalition, which includes the INC. There are many other political groupings : Pashupati Kumar Paras led Rashtriya Lok Janshakti Party is a constituent of the NDA, and does not agree with Yadav's RJD;  the weakened Communist Party of India; CPM and Forward Bloc have minor presences; ultra left parties like CPML and Party Unity have significant following in some parts of Bihar.

Gallery

Elections

General elections

Political parties in Bihar

National parties 

 Bahujan Samaj Party
 Bharatiya Janata Party
 Communist party of India
 Communist Party of India (Marxist)
 Indian National Congress

Regional parties 

 All India Majlis-e-Ittehadul Muslimeen 
 Janata Dal (United)
 Rashtriya Janata Dal
 Communist Party of India (Marxist–Leninist) Liberation
 Hindustani Awam Morcha (Secular)
 Rashtriya Lok Janshakti Party
 Lok Janshakti Party (Ram Vilas)
 Vikassheel Insaan Party
 Jan Adhikar Party
 Bharatiya Jan Congress
 Bihar People's Party
 Bihar Vikas Party
 Kisan Vikas Party
 All India Forward Bloc
 Krantikari Samyavadi Party
 Rashtrawadi Kisan Sanghatan
 Samajwadi Krantikari Sena
 Sampurna Vikas Dal
 Rashtriya Jan Jan Party
 Plurals Party
 Krantikari Mukti Morcha

See also 

History of Patna
 Political parties in Bihar
 List of Chief Ministers of Bihar
 List of Deputy Chief Ministers of Bihar
 List of Finance Ministers of Bihar
 Politicians from Bihar

References

Citations

General bibliography 
 Radhakanta Barik, Land & Caste Politics in Bihar (Shipra Publications, Delhi, 2006)
 Jagannath Sarkar, Many Streams: Selected Essays by Jagannath Sarkar and Reminiscing Sketches. Compiled by Gautam Sarkar Edited by Mitali Sarkar, first published May 2010, Navakarnataka Publications Private Limited, Bangalore.

External links 

 Official website
 Profile at the Government of India website
 Bihar CM official website
 caste statics and voting behavior in Bihar
 A former IAS officer reflects on the mess in Bihar

 
Bihar